CITL-DT (channel 4) is a CTV-affiliated television station in Lloydminster, a city located on the border of the Canadian provinces of Alberta and Saskatchewan. It is owned by Stingray Radio alongside Citytv affiliate CKSA-DT (channel 2). Both stations share studios at 50 Street and 51 Avenue on the Alberta side of Lloydminster, while CITL-DT's transmitter is located near Highway 17 and Township Road 512, near the Saskatchewan provincial line.

History
The station first signed on the air on July 28, 1976, and has been a CTV affiliate since its sign-on. CITL, along with their sister station CKSA, were acquired by Newcap Broadcasting in 2005 from their former owner, Midwest Television.

Prior to the August 31, 2011 digital transition, CITL had rebroadcast transmitters in Wainwright, Provost, Bonnyville, Meadow Lake and Alcot Trail. The station's main transmitter was required to participate in the digital transition, but Newcap also decided to shut its other transmitters, other than Alcot Lake's, on the same date, though there was no requirement to shut down or convert any of these other transmitters to digital.

The station had attempted to add a rebroadcaster in Fort McMurray in 2006, but this was subsequently withdrawn. The application had been surprising since a CTV-owned station, CFRN-TV, had already served the area on cable with some separate news programming and commercials since 1990 from CFRN's repeater in Ashmont.

CITL along with CKSA are two of the last remaining Canadian stations that continue to sign off overnight, along with Omni Television stations and others.

Programming
As of October 18, 2018, CITL clears the vast majority of the CTV schedule, and is currently the only CTV station in Western Canada to air the network's national morning shows (formerly Canada AM; currently Your Morning) on a tape delay in the 6–9 a.m. time slot (with all CTV owned-and-operated stations between Vancouver and Winnipeg airing local CTV Morning Live programs instead). The station carries the entirety of CTV's prime time lineup. Previously, the station preempted stripped broadcasts of etalk and/or repeats of The Big Bang Theory on certain nights with local programming. Additionally, CITL preempts CTV's The View in favor of 100 Huntley Street, a brokered religious program which is also commonly aired by Global stations, as well as the weekend's network repeats of the previous night's late edition of TSN's SportsCentre for Eat Street and infomercials and Sunday's Question Period. CITL also breaks away from the network late-night schedule at about 2:12 a.m. (after Conan) on weeknights, and earlier on weekends, to sign off, as CITL, along with sister CKSA, have the Canadian national anthem "O Canada" played during the sign-off.

Until the mid-to-late 2000s, CITL also carried some Global programming alongside CTV shows; however, this was discontinued at some point after Global Edmonton was made available on basic cable in Lloydminster. Nonetheless the station sometimes carries various Canadian-made programs from the library of Global's parent company Corus Entertainment, though this is generally restricted to older programming (or at least older seasons) not currently airing on the Global network schedule.

CITL airs Prime Time Local News from 5–7 p.m., and Late Local News at 11:30 p.m. on weeknights; there is no local news on weekends. The 5 p.m. hour of Prime Time Local News is simulcast on CKSA. In addition, unlike CKSA where it simulcasts newscasts from Global Edmonton, CITL does not simulcast any newscasts from CTV Edmonton or any other CTV station. Reruns of Chopped Canada airs at noon, in place of any local newscast, or the noon hour newscast from CTV Edmonton.

CITL and CKSA previously aired Newcap News until August 31, 2018. On September 4, 2018, the newscasts were reformatted from a traditional newscast to a news magazine, and was re-branded as Prime Time Local News.

Former transmitters

Until August 31, 2011, CITL-DT also operated the first four transmitters listed below. According to Industry Canada's TV database, as of August 2012, the station no longer has a broadcast licence for the last transmitter noted. Therefore, the station no longer has any rebroadcasting transmitters.

References

External links

 

ITL-DT
ITL-DT
ITL-DT
Television channels and stations established in 1976
Mass media in Lloydminster
Stingray Group
1976 establishments in Alberta
1976 establishments in Saskatchewan